Digi International is an American Industrial Internet of Things (IIoT) technology company headquartered in Hopkins, Minnesota. The company was founded in 1985 and went public as Digi International in 1989. The company initially offered intelligent ISA/PCI boards (the 'DigiBoard') with multiple asynchronous serial interfaces for PCs.  Multi-port serial boards are still sold, but the company focuses on embedded and external network (wired and wireless) communications as well as scalable USB products. The company also sells radio modems and embedded modules based on LTE (4G) communications platforms.

Acquisition history 
Digi International has acquired a number of companies since it went public.
2021 Digi acquired Ventus Holdings.
2021 Digi acquired Ctek, a company specializing in remote monitoring and industrial controls.
2021 Digi acquired Haxiot.
2019 Digi acquired Opengear.
2018 Digi acquired Accelerated Concepts, a provider of secure, enterprise-grade, cellular (LTE) networking equipment for primary and backup connectivity.
2017 Digi acquired TempAlert, a provider of temperature and task management for retail pharmacy, food service, and industrial applications.
2017 Digi acquired SMART Temps, LLC, a provider of real-time food service temperature management for restaurant, grocery, education and hospital settings as well as real-time temperature management for healthcare.
2016 Digi acquired FreshTemps, temperature monitoring and task management for the food industry.
2015 Digi acquired Bluenica, Toronto-based company focused on temperature monitoring of perishable goods in the food industry.
2012 Digi acquired  Etherios a Chicago-based salesforce.com Platinum Partner.
2009 Digi acquired Mobiapps a fabless manufacturer of satellite modems on the Orbcomm satellite network.
2008 Digi acquired Spectrum Design Solutions Inc.  for $10 million, a design services company specializing in Wireless Design technologies.
2008 Digi acquired a European manufacturer of cellular router products, Sarian Systems Ltd. for $30.5 million.
2006 Digi acquired MaxStream, a company that specialized in wireless technology primarily for embedded electronics is purchased for $38.8M.
2005 Digi acquired FS Forth-Systeme GmbH (Breisach, Germany) and Sistemas Embebidos S.A. (Logroño, Spain), manufacturers of embedded processor modules using Net Silicon and other processor platforms.
2005 Digi acquires Rabbit Semiconductor a manufacturer of Z180 based silicon, embedded modules and Single Board Computers.
2003 Digi acquired Embrace Networks a provider of EDP micro-client technology.
2002 Digi acquired Net Silicon a fabless manufacturer of ARM-based microprocessors with a focus on networking.
2001 Digi acquired Decision Europe a French company with its brand name Xcell Technology for the serial TCP/IP products and Remote Access Server.
2000 Digi acquired Inside Out Networks, a manufacturer of USB connectivity solutions based in Austin, Texas. The company as a brand of Digi International functioned until 2006 when it was phased out, and all Inside Out products are now branded as Digi.
1998 Digi acquired ITK International, Inc. (ITK), a Dortmund, Germany provider of open systems, remote access for small- and medium-sized businesses, including a Voice over Internet Protocol (VOIP).
1998 Digi acquired Central Data Corp, Champaign, IL.
1991 Digi acquired Arnet Corp.

References

Wireless sensor network
Sensors
Computer peripheral companies
Networking companies of the United States
American companies established in 1985
Companies based in Minnetonka, Minnesota
Companies listed on the Nasdaq